Gleb Syritsa (born 14 April 2000) is a Russian road and track cyclist, who currently rides for UCI WorldTeam .

Major results

Track

2017
 UCI Junior World Championships
1st  Team pursuit
2nd  Madison (with Lev Gonov)
 1st  Team pursuit, UEC European Junior Championships
 UCI World Cup
3rd  Team pursuit, Minsk
 2nd Team pursuit, National Championships
2018
 UCI Junior World Championships
2nd  Madison (with Lev Gonov)
3rd  Individual pursuit
 National Championships
1st  Team pursuit
2nd Madison
 3rd  Team pursuit, UEC European Under-23 Championships
2019
 1st  Team pursuit, European Games
 1st  Team pursuit, UEC European Under-23 Championships
 National Championships
1st  Team pursuit
2nd Madison
2020
 UEC European Under-23 Championships
1st  Points race
1st  Omnium
1st  Team pursuit
 National Championships
1st  Omnium
2nd Madison
2021
 UCI Nations Cup
1st  Individual pursuit, St. Petersburg
1st  Team pursuit, St. Petersburg
 National Championships
1st  Madison (with Vlas Shichkin)
1st  Individual pursuit
1st  Team pursuit

Road
2019
 1st 
 10th Circuito del Porto
2020
 2nd Grand Prix Mount Erciyes
2021
 1st Circuito del Porto
 1st 
2022
 1st Overall Circuito Montañés
 1st 
 1st 
 1st 
 1st Stage 1 Tour de Langkawi
 1st Stage 3

References

External links

2000 births
Living people
Russian male cyclists
Russian track cyclists
European Games gold medalists for Russia
Cyclists at the 2019 European Games
European Games medalists in cycling